Hesar-e Bahram Khan (also Romanized as Ḩeşār-e Bahrām Khān and Ḩeşār-e Bahrāmkhān) is a village in Nazlu-e Shomali Rural District, Nazlu District, Urmia County, West Azerbaijan Province, Iran. At the 2006 census, its population was 262, in 65 families.

References 

Populated places in Urmia County